Tony Garnier may refer to:

 Tony Garnier (architect) (1869–1948), French architect and city planner
 Tony Garnier (musician) (born 1955), American bassist
 Halle Tony Garnier, French concert hall